Angelo Menon (29 October 1919 – 12 December 2013) was an Italian racing cyclist. He won stage 7 of the 1951 Giro d'Italia.

References

External links
 

1919 births
2013 deaths
Italian male cyclists
Italian Giro d'Italia stage winners
Place of birth missing
Sportspeople from Verona
Cyclists from the Province of Verona